"There's Something on Your Mind (Part 2)" is a  song originally recorded as "There Is Something on Your Mind" in 1957 by Big Jay McNeely.  The song credits Cecil James McNeely as its writer, Big Jay McNeely's birth name. The song has been recorded many times since then by Big Jay McNeely himself with various collaborators.

Background
Though McNeely is listed as the song's writer, he has freely admitted that he purchased the song from the Rivingtons' vocalist John "Sonny" Harris, who in turn had lifted much of it from a gospel song, "Something on My Mind" by the Highway QCs.  The lead vocalist on this original recording was Little Sonny Warner. 
The song was recorded along his band in a small Seattle recording studio, and leased more than a year later to Los Angeles disc jockey Hunter Hancock's Swingin' Records label.

Chart performance
This first recording reached number 42 on Billboard's pop chart and number 5 on the R&B chart in early 1959.

Cover version
In 1960, Bobby Marchan recorded his version.  The single was Marchan's most successful release on both the R&B and pop singles chart, where it peaked at number one on the R&B charts and number thirty-one on the Billboard Hot 100.

Other versions
Versions have been recorded by many other artists, including: 
Freddy Fender
B.B. King, Albert King
Etta James
Gene Vincent
Baby Lloyd Stallworth (of the Famous Flames)
The Jolly Jacks (who parodied the violence of the Marchan recording)

References

1960 singles
Novelty songs
1957 songs
Song articles with missing songwriters